The word Marocain can mean:

 Cinsaut, a wine grape
 Carignan, another wine grape
 marocain, or crêpe marocain, a ribbed crape (textile)
 The French word for "Moroccan"